Bhili, is a Western Indo-Aryan language spoken in west-central India, in the states of Rajasthan, Gujarat, Maharashtra, and Madhya Pradesh. Other names for the language include Bhagoria and Bhilboli; several varieties are called Garasia. Bhili is a member of the Bhil languages, which are related to Gujarati and Rajasthani. The language is written using the Devanagari script.
 Bhili has no official status in India.

Phonology

Consonants 

  occurs in loanwords from Persian and Hindi.
  is heard as an allophone of  preceding .

Vowels 

  is borrowed from Hindi.

Further reading
 Bodhankar, Anantrao. Bhillori (Bhilli) – English Dictionary. Pune: Tribal Research & Training Institute, 2002.
 Jungblut, L. A Short Bhili Grammar of Jhabua State and Adjoining Territories. S.l: s.n, 1937.
 Thompson, Charles S. Rudiments of the Bhili Language. Ahmedabad [India]: United Printing Press, 1895.

See also 
 Languages of India
 Languages with official status in India
 List of Indian languages by total speakers

References 

Western Indo-Aryan languages
Languages of India
Languages of Madhya Pradesh
Languages of Rajasthan
Bhil